Nicolae Haralambie (August 27, 1835 in Chișinău – April 3, 1908 in Bucharest) was a Romanian soldier and politician. 

In 1861, he headed the Bucharest police. As a colonel, he took part in the dethronement of Prince Alexandru Ioan Cuza in 1866, subsequently serving in a regency alongside Lascăr Catargiu and Nicolae Golescu. 

He served as War Minister from August 6, 1866, to February 7, 1867. 

On July 7, 1874, together with Ion Ghica and a third person, Haralambie performed a flight over Bucharest in a hydrogen balloon named "Mihai Bravul".

He returned to the Romanian Army in 1877, taking part in the War of Independence as a brigadier general, and fighting  with distinction at the battles of Smârdan and Vidin. Elected senator in 1879, Haralambie joined a coalition that took down the Ion Brătianu government.

References

1835 births
1908 deaths
People from Chișinău
Romanian Ministers of Defence
Romanian Land Forces generals
Romanian military personnel of the Russo-Turkish War (1877–1878)
19th-century Romanian politicians